Lan Cheng-lung (born March 1, 1979) is a Taiwanese actor and film director. He was born in Yilan, Taiwan.

Career 
Lan made his acting debut in 2001 and gained attention for one of his first roles, a small cameo as Ya-men, Dao Ming Si's older cousin in Meteor Garden. Lan has appeared in many popular films and dramas since then, including Night Market Hero (2011) and ''The Wonderful Wedding (2015).

Personal life 
Lan was in a high-profile relationship with actress Barbie Hsu from 2001 to 2005. He met his future wife, Jade Chou, in 2003 but the two only began dating in 2011 after they shot a commercial together. They married in May 2014. They have a daughter and a son.

Filmography

Television series

Film

Music video appearances

Awards and nominations

References

External links 

 
 

1979 births
Living people
Taiwanese male television actors
Taiwanese male film actors
21st-century Taiwanese male actors
Taiwanese film directors
People from Luodong, Yilan County, Taiwan